Branchinecta is a genus of crustacean in family Branchinectidae. It includes around 50 species, found on all continents except Australia. A new genus, Archaebranchinecta was established in 2011 for two species previously placed in Branchinecta.
Branchinecta achalensis Cesar, 1985
Branchinecta belki Maeda-Martínez, Obregón-Barboza & Dumont, 1992 
Branchinecta brushi Hegna & Lazo-Wasem, 2010
Branchinecta campestris Lynch, 1960 – pocket-pouch fairy shrimp
Branchinecta coloradensis Packard, 1874 – Colorado fairy shrimp
Branchinecta constricta Rogers, 2006
Branchinecta conservatio Eng, Belk & Eriksen, 1990  – conservancy fairy shrimp
Branchinecta cornigera Lynch, 1958 – horned fairy shrimp
Branchinecta dissimilis Lynch, 1972 – Great Basin fairy shrimp
Branchinecta ferox (M. Milne-Edwards, 1840)
Branchinecta gaini Daday, 1910
Branchinecta gigas Lynch, 1937  – giant fairy shrimp
Branchinecta granulosa Daday, 1902
Branchinecta hiberna Rogers & Fugate, 2001 – winter fairy shrimp
Branchinecta iheringi Lilljeborg, 1889
Branchinecta kaibabensis Belk & Fugate, 2000 – Kaibab fairy shrimp
Branchinecta lateralis Rogers, 2006
Branchinecta leonensis Cesar, 1985
Branchinecta lindahli Packard, 1883 – versatile fairy shrimp
Branchinecta longiantenna Eng, Belk & Eriksen, 1990  – longhorn fairy shrimp
Branchinecta lynchi Eng, Belk & Eriksen, 1990  – vernal pool fairy shrimp
Branchinecta mackini Dexter, 1956 – alkali fairy shrimp
Branchinecta mediospina Rogers, Dasis & Murrow, 2011
Branchinecta mesovallensis Belk & Fugate, 2000 – mid-valley fairy shrimp
Branchinecta mexicana Maeda-Martínez, Obregón-Barboza & Dumont, 1992 
Branchinecta minuta Smirnov, 1948
Branchinecta oriena Belk & Rogers, 2002
Branchinecta orientalis G. O. Sars, 1901
Branchinecta oterosanvicentei Obregón-Barboza, et al., 2002
Branchinecta packardi Pearse, 1912 – Packard fairy shrimp
Branchinecta paludosa (O. F. Müller, 1788) – circumpolar fairy shrimp
Branchinecta palustris Birabén, 1946
Branchinecta papillosa Birabén, 1946
Branchinecta potassa Belk, 1979 – Nebraska fairy shrimp
Branchinecta prima Cohen, 1983
Branchinecta raptor Rogers, Quinney, Weaver, and Olesen 2006
Branchinecta readingi Belk, 2000 – Reading fairy shrimp
Branchinecta rocaensis Cohen, 1982
Branchinecta sandiegonensis Fugate, 1993  – San Diego fairy shrimp
Branchinecta serrata Rogers, 2006
Branchinecta somuncurensis Cohen, 1983
Branchinecta tarensis Birabén, 1946
Branchinecta tolli (G. O. Sars, 1897)
Branchinecta valchetana Cohen, 1981
Branchinecta vuriloche Cohen, 1985

References

External links

Anostraca
Branchiopoda genera
Taxonomy articles created by Polbot